Thomas McMahon (born 17 June 1936, in Dorking, Surrey) is an English Roman Catholic bishop. From 1980 to 2014, he was the Bishop of Brentwood; he is currently Bishop Emeritus.

Life

McMahon grew up in Harlow and attended St. Bede's Grammar School, Manchester, before training for the priesthood at St. Sulpice, Paris. He was ordained on 28 November 1959 at the seminary in Wonersh.

He was appointed an assistant priest in Colchester, where he served for five years. From 1964 to 1969 he was appointed to Westcliff-on-Sea, and then became parish priest of Stock (where he continues to live as parish priest). From 1972 to 1980 he served as Chaplain to Essex University. He was a member of the National Ecumenical Commission.

On 16 June 1980, Pope John Paul II appointed Fr McMahon as the Bishop of Brentwood. On 17 July 1980 Cardinal Basil Hume consecrated him as a bishop. He has been a member of I.C.E.L. (representing the Bishops of England and Wales on the Episcopal Board) since 1983. He was Chairman of the Bishops' Pastoral Liturgy Committee from 1983 to 1997, and has been Chairman of the Bishops' Church Music Committee since 1985.

Work in the diocese

McMahon was Chairman of the Brentwood Diocesan Ecumenical Commission in 1979. Brentwood is the only diocese in the country with boundaries that are co-terminous to the Anglican Diocese and there is very close co-operation on both a personal and pastoral level between the two bishops. They meet every month in the early morning for an hour's prayer, followed by a working breakfast. They undertake many joint engagements in their dioceses.

Brentwood has five ecumenical parishes where there is shared ownership of the church between the denominations; two shared primary schools and there is also a joint pilgrimage each year to the Chapel of St Peter-on-the-Wall, Bradwell. McMahon was Chairman of the Essex Church Leaders Consultative Council from 1984 to 1993, and he is a member of the Barking Church Leaders Group and the London Church Leaders Group.

McMahon is patron of a number of groups and organisations, notably Vice-President of Pax Christi since 1987. He was a founder member of the Movement for Christian Democracy and together with Lord Alton visited refugee camps and homes in Albania in September 1999.

McMahon takes special interest in all areas of pastoral work. He has been involved with various developments in the diocese, including the establishment of the Justice and Peace Commission; Social Welfare Commission; Youth Commission and the Diocesan Pastoral Centre at New Hall and the Diocesan House of Prayer at Brentwood.

There have also been various programmes in the diocese, such as the Diocesan Renewal Programme, the Movement for a Better World (1982); the Ministry to Priests Programme (1984); and a ten-year pastoral plan for the diocese leading up to the year 2000.

He was responsible for the building of the diocesan offices 'Cathedral House' in Brentwood (1982), followed by the building of a new Cathedral in 1989 by the classical architect, Quinlan Terry. It is the first cathedral to be built in the classical style since St. Paul's. McMahon has also founded a Cathedral and Choral Trust and extended the Choir School (2000).

Since his consecration as Bishop of Brentwood in 1980, the Catholic population of the diocese has increased steadily, while the number of priests has remained approximately stable, leading to a decline in the ratio of priests to people comparable with that occurring elsewhere in the Western world over the same period. As of December 2018, there are nine students in training for the priesthood.

In March 2015 it was heard at Southwark Crown Court that McMahon was one of two bishops responsible for allowing Anthony McSweeney to be appointed as a priest in the Roman Catholic Diocese of East Anglia following an incident in 1998 in which "a housekeeper found what she said were pornographic images at [McSweeney's] home." The matter was heard by McMahon, and explained to Bishop Peter Smith, and was decided upon as an incident for clergy discipline and not investigated by the police. McSweeney was allowed to continue practising as a priest and governor at a local high school. Anthony McSweeney was later jailed for abusing boys at the Grafton House children's home between 1978 and 1981.

Recognition

McMahon's wide involvement in the life of the county of Essex was recognised when in 1991 he was awarded an honorary doctorate of the University of Essex and in 1992 elected President of the Essex Show. He is a member of the Court of both the University of Essex and the North East London University.

His personal hobbies and interests include music, reading, art, architecture, tennis and walking. Mayhew McCrimmon have published two of his books: The Mass Explained and Altar Servers' Handbook.

Retirement
McMahon tendered his resignation as Bishop of Brentwood on reaching the age of 75 in June 2011 and celebrated a farewell Mass in December 2012, and remained in the post until 2014, when Alan Williams was announced as the new Bishop of Brentwood.

Bibliography

References

External links
Diocese of Brentwood web site: Biography of Bishop Thomas

1936 births
People associated with the University of Essex
People from Dorking
Roman Catholic bishops of Brentwood
People educated at St Bede's College, Manchester
Living people
People from Stock, Essex